Azaleatin is a chemical compound. It is an O-methylated flavonol, a type of flavonoid. It was first isolated from the flowers of Rhododendron mucronatum in 1956 and has since been recorded in forty-four other Rhododendron species, in Plumbago capensis, in Ceratostigma willmottiana and in Carya pecan. It has been also been found in the leaves of Eucryphia.

Glycosides 
Azalein is the 3-O-α-L-rhamnoside of azaleatin.

References 

O-methylated flavonols
Catechols